WarHorse is a doom metal band that formed in Worcester, Massachusetts, United States, in 1996, and released their debut album, As Heaven Turns to Ash on Southern Lord Records in 2001. They officially disbanded in 2005 after releasing the single "I Am Dying".

In 2019, after the passing of former guitarist Todd Laskowski, WarHorse reemerged for what was planned as a one-off tribute set at Maryland Doom Fest. The band was then offered a spot at Psycho Las Vegas, which led to a handful of additional shows before the pandemic shut down the live music world. Not to be discouraged, WarHorse returned in September of 2021 to play the Decibel Magazine Metal & Beer Fest.

Members
 Jerry Orne - bass, vocals (1996-current)
 Mike Hubbard - drums (1996-current)
 Terry Savastano - guitar (1998-current)
 Krista Van Guilder - vocals, guitar (1996–1998)
 Matt Smith - vocals, guitar (1998–1999)
 Todd Laskowski - guitar (1998)

Discography

External links
 Warhorse's Bandcamp page
 Southern Lord Records Official Site
 Warhorse Fan Page by FirkinGood

American doom metal musical groups
American sludge metal musical groups
American stoner rock musical groups
Musical groups established in 1996
Musical groups disestablished in 2005
American musical trios